KMRAP – Korea Mine Resistant Ambush Protected is an MRAP infantry mobility vehicle that can protect the occupants from antitank mines and IEDs using anti-shock seats and reinforced V-hull that deflect blast. Built by Doosan of South Korea.

References

Armoured fighting vehicles of South Korea
Armoured personnel carriers
Armoured fighting vehicles of the post–Cold War period